Turri is a comune (municipality) in the Province of South Sardinia in the Italian region Sardinia, located about  northwest of Cagliari and about  north of Sanluri.

Turri borders the following municipalities: Baradili, Baressa, Genuri, Pauli Arbarei, Setzu, Tuili, Ussaramanna.

Demographic evolution

References

Cities and towns in Sardinia